Kim Kun-Hoan (born 12 August 1986) is a South Korean football player.

Club career 
On 6 January 2017, he joined FC Seoul.

For the 2020 season, he joined Gangneung Citizen FC. He left the club at the end of the season.

International career
He was a member of the South Korea team for the 2008 Summer Olympics finals.
On June 3, 2009, he made his first international cap for South Korea at the friendly match against Oman national football team on 2 June 2009. But this match was not full A match.

Club statistics

References

External links

 
 Kim Kun-hoan – National Team stats at KFA 
 J. League (#5)
 

1986 births
Living people
Association football defenders
South Korean footballers
South Korea international footballers
South Korean expatriate footballers
Yokohama F. Marinos players
Montedio Yamagata players
Sagan Tosu players
Albirex Niigata players
J1 League players
Ulsan Hyundai FC players
Suwon FC players
FC Seoul players
Gyeongnam FC players
Incheon United FC players
K League 1 players
K League 2 players
K3 League players
Expatriate footballers in Japan
Footballers at the 2008 Summer Olympics
Olympic footballers of South Korea
South Korean expatriate sportspeople in Japan
Kyung Hee University alumni